Hinks Channel is an arc-shaped channel in the northern part of Laubeuf Fjord,  wide and  long, which extends from The Gullet and separates Day Island on the west from Arrowsmith Peninsula and Wyatt Island on the east, off the west coast of Graham Land, Antarctica. It was first roughly surveyed in 1936 by the British Graham Land Expedition under Rymill, and was resurveyed in 1948 by the Falkland Islands Dependencies Survey who named it for Arthur R. Hinks.

References

Channels of the Southern Ocean
Straits of Graham Land
Loubet Coast